León is a department in Nicaragua. It covers an area of 5,138 km2 and has a population of 423,012 (2021 estimate). The capital is the city of León.

Municipalities 
 El Jicaral
 El Sauce
 La Paz Centro
 Larreynaga
 León
 Nagarote
 Quezalguaque
 San José de Achuapa
 Santa Rosa del Peñón
 Telica

References 

 
Departments of Nicaragua